The Fatima Family Apostolate (FFA) (Fatima Family Apostolate International) is a U.S.-based Roman Catholic Apostolate with headquarters in Hanceville, Alabama, founded in 1986 by Fr. Robert J. Fox and named after Our Lady of Fátima.  Mr. John C. Preiss is currently the President.

History

In the mid 1970s, Robert J. Fox, a priest incardinated in the Roman Catholic Diocese of Sioux Falls, and a prominent author and speaker on devotion to Our Lady of Fatima, founded "Youth for Fatima", an apostolate that conducted thirteen day pilgrimages to Fatima for young people. This grew into the Fatima Family Apostolate, which was founded in 1986, with the encouragement of the Pontifical Council for the Laity. Fox took his inspiration from Pope John Paul II's November 22, 1981 encyclical Familiaris Consortio (On the Role of the Christian Family in the Modern World).

At the time, Fox was assigned to the parish of St. Mary of Mercy in Alexandria, South Dakota. There, he built a Marian shrine now known as the Fatima Family Shrine. It was the third Marian shrine Fox built, having previously erected shrines during earlier assignments at St. Bernard's Parish in Redfield and the parish of the Immaculate Conception in Waubay. The shrine in Alexandria was dedicated during the 1987 Marian Year by Alberto Cosme do Amaral, bishop of the Roman Catholic Diocese of Leiria-Fátima, and is maintained largely through freewill donations.

In September 1987 Fox hosted the first annual Marian Congress in America at Alexandria. The 1989 Congress was attended by Édouard Cardinal Gagnon, President of the Pontifical Council for the Family.

Fox had many speaking engagements and during a visit to Moscow, presented Tadeusz Kondrusiewicz, Archbishop and Metropolitan of the Catholic Archdiocese of the Mother of God in Moscow, a statue of Our Lady of Fatima as a gift to the Russian people. FFA "...considers it to have been one of its greatest honors, when Archbishop Kondrusiewicz, ...requested the FFA to finance the building of Russia's first Fatima shrine."

Robert J. Fox, Founder of the FFA, died on 26 November 2009 at his home in Hanceville, AL, USA.  A lay person author and writer and convert to the Catholic Church, John C. Preiss, became President of the Fatima Family Apostolate and Editor of the quarterly magazine the Immaculate Heart Messenger.

The FFA is located in Hanceville, Alabama. It is an international Apostolate, having members all over the world and publishes a quarterly magazine called the Immaculate Heart Messenger.

The FFA has built shrines in honor of Our Lady in Alexandria, South Dakota and Hanceville, Alabama.  The FFA operates the Father Robert J. Fox and Our Lady of Fatima Museum to educate its visitors on the life of Father Fox and the message of Our Lady of Fatima.

Spirituality
The Apostolate's stated main goal is the sanctification of family life. The Apostolate follows the Apostolic Exhortation of Pope John Paul II Familiaris Consortio (The Role of the Christian Family in the Modem World) regarding the spiritual connection between matrimony and the Holy Eucharist.

Members meet at least once per month to pray and discuss spiritual reading done in the course of the month. They educate their children to pray. Apart from morning and evening prayer and prayers before meals, certain forms of prayer are expressly encouraged, including reading, meditating and other devotions and practices.

Operation
The governing document if the Charter of the Fatima Family Apostolate. The Marian Manual provides the key formats for the meetings once a chapter is established.

The FFA has no source of income and no dues are required of members. There is no major staff. The Immaculate Heart Messenger Magazine serves as a means of communication among the various groups. The President of the FFA serves as the editor of the Immaculate Heart Messenger- 

The FFA has six major segments in which members may participate according to their needs and circumstances: Married Marian Couples, Youth For Fatima, Fatima Prayer Groups, and Suffering Members for the Conversion of One's Country - for disabled people.

There are FFA groups in Australia and the Philippines where its magazine, the Immaculate Heart Messenger is printed for places in Asia.

Immaculate Heart Messenger
Immaculate Heart Messenger is a quarterly magazine published by FFA. It was founded by Fox, a columnist for the National Catholic Register, and a frequent contributor to Our Sunday Visitor, as well as to various other Catholic publications. Before his death in November 2009, he appointed John Preiss, to succeed him as president of FFA and editor of the Messenger.

The magazine promotes conservative Catholic teachings with regard to sexuality and marriage, opposing birth control, divorce, abortion, and what it considers to be indecent literature and film.
 
The Immaculate Heart Messenger is designed to teach people about the Catholic faith, to pray and read Scripture. It consists of articles about applying church teachings in the present day. Each issue of Immaculate Heart Messenger contains news briefs, subscriber forum, questions and answers, various articles explaining various aspects of the Catholic faith such as prayer, catechism, the Sacraments, Lent, Advent, Scripture, stories about the lives of the saints or personal witnesses. Articles and meditations are written by guest writers. The magazine layout was a full color 8x11 size and includes pictures and photographs. It subsequently switched to a newsletter format.

References

External links

Magazine Covers from The Immaculate Heart Messenger

Catholic organizations established in the 20th century
Cullman County, Alabama
Christian organizations established in 1986
1986 establishments in Alabama